Rowing was part of the 1983 Pan American Games. There were eight boat classes for men, and two for women.

Men's events

Women's events

Medal table

References

Events at the 1983 Pan American Games
1983
Rowing in Venezuela